Ohme is a surname. Notable people with the surname include:

 Johan Andreas Cornelius Ohme (1746–1818), Danish-Norwegian army officer
 Kevin Ohme (born 1971), Major League Baseball pitcher
 Melanie Ohme (born 1990), German chess player